Carlito's Way is a 1975 American crime novel written by Edwin Torres.  The novel and its 1979 sequel After Hours were the basis of the 1993 Brian De Palma film Carlito's Way as well as the 2005 prequel film Carlito's Way: Rise to Power.

Production 
Torres has stated that Brigante was a combination of several men he knew in his street days, as well as a compilation of several of his own personal characteristics.

Plot
A Puerto Rican gangster, Carlito Brigante, is released early from prison and tries to go straight and leave his former life of crime behind.

Film 
Brigante has been portrayed by Al Pacino in the 1993 film Carlito's Way, and by Jay Hernandez in the prequel Carlito's Way: Rise to Power.

References

External links
Good Reads

1975 American novels
Carlito's Way
American novels adapted into films
E. P. Dutton books